This is a list of fellows of the Royal Society elected in 1709.

Fellows
 Henry Cressener (1683–1710)
 Guido Grandi (1671–1742)
 Robert Hunter (1666–1734)
 Johann Friedrich Leopold (1676–1711)
 Lorenzo Magalotti (1637–1712)
 Henry Newton (1651–1715)
 Samuel Tufnell (1682–1758)

References

1709
1709 in science
1709 in England